Reptomulticava is an extinct genus of bryozoa belonging to the order Cyclostomatida. Specimens have been reported from France, Spain, and in the southern Western Interior of North America.

References 

Mesozoic animals
Cyclostomatida
Extinct bryozoans